The 1906 All-Western college football team consists of American football players selected to the All-Western teams chosen by various selectors for the 1906 college football season.

All-Western selections

Ends
 Bobby Marshall, Minnesota (CA, CC, CDN, CE, CEP, CIO, CJ, CRH, CT, ECP-1, OL, SLG) (CFHOF)
 Mysterious Walker, Chicago (CA, CC, CDN, CE, CIO, CJ, CRH, ECP-1, SLG)
 Franz "Dutch" Frurip, Wabash (CT)
 Frank W. Johnson, Nebraska (ECP-2)
 Charles J. Moynihan, Illinois (ECP-2)

Tackles
 Joe Curtis, Michigan (CA, CC, CDN, CE, CEP, CIO, CJ, CRH, CT, ECP-1, SLG)
 Ed Parry, Chicago (CA, CC, CDN, CE, CEP [end], CIO, CJ, CRH [guard], ECP-1, OL [end], SLG)
 George Leland Case, Minnesota (CC [guard], CE [guard], CEP, CRH [guard], CT, ECP-2, OL)
 Franklin C. Wade, Indiana (ECP-2)

Guards
 Forest Van Hook, Illinois (CDN, CEP, CT, ECP-1, SLG)
Theodore Vita, Minnesota (CA, CDN, CE, CEP, CJ, CT, ECP-2, OL, SLG)
 William "Bill" Ittner, Minnesota (CC, CIO, CRH [tackle], ECP-1, OL [tackle])
 Warren A. Gelbach, Wisconsin (CIO)
 Walter D. Graham, Michigan (CJ, ECP-2)
 Smith, Minnesota (CA, OL)

Centers
 Orren Eark Safford, Minnesota (CC, CDN, CE, CEP, CIO, CRH, ECP-1, OL, SLG)
  Lloyd A. Waugh, Indiana (CJ, ECP-2)
 Stechm, Wisconsin (CT)
 W. Wellinghoff, Purdue (CA)

Quarterbacks
  Walter Eckersall, Chicago (CA, CC, CDN, CE, CEP, CIO, CJ, CRH, CT, ECP-1, OL, SLG) (CFHOF)
 Frank K. Hare, Indiana (ECP-2)

Halfbacks
 Walter Steffen, Chicago (CA, CDN, CE, CEP, CIO, CJ, CT, ECP-2, SLG) (CFHOF)
 John Schuknecht, Minnesota (CC, CDN, CIO, CRH, ECP-1, OL, SLG)
 Heze Clark, Indiana (CE, CEP, CJ, CRH, CT, ECP-1)
 Hodge, Illinois (CA)
 Paul Magoffin, Michigan (CC, ECP-2)
 William C. Doane, Minnesota (OL)

Fullbacks
 John Garrels, Michigan (CA, CC, CDN, CE, CEP, CIO, CJ, CRH, CT, ECP-1, OL, SLG)
 Earl Current, Minnesota (ECP-2)

Key
CA = Chicago American

CC = Chicago Chronicle

CDN = Chicago Daily News

CE = Chicago Examiner

CEP = Chicago Evening Post

CIO = Chicago Inter-Ocean

CJ = Chicago Journal

CRH = Chicago Record-Herald

CT = Chicago Tribune

ECP = Elmer C. Patterson for Collier's Weekly

OL = O'Loughlin in The Minneapolis Journal

SLG = St. Louis Globe-Democrat

CFHOF = College Football Hall of Fame

See also
1906 College Football All-America Team

References

All-Western team
All-Western college football teams